Nahr-e Meseyyer (also known as Massīr, Meseyyer, Mosayyer, and Mosayyer-e Jonūbī) is a village in Abshar Rural District, in the Central District of Shadegan County, Khuzestan Province, Iran. At the 2006 census, its population was 3,221, in 654 families.

References 

Populated places in Shadegan County